Brooke Davis may refer to:

 Brooke Davis (One Tree Hill), a character from the TV series One Tree Hill 
 Brooke Davis (writer) (born 1980), Australian novelist